Arau is the royal capital of Perlis, Malaysia with a population of around 20,000. The red-roofed Istana (Royal Palace) is a mixture of colonial and pseudo-Moorish architectural styles.

This town is the disembarkation point for visitors travelling from Kuala Lumpur to Langkawi by train.

Tourist attractions
 Perlis State Mosque

Notable natives
 Azlan Man, Chief Minister of Perlis

Transportation

 Arau railway station

See also
 House of Jamalullail (Perlis)
 Royal capitals of Malaysian states

References
 Arau